John L. Roman is an American television and film producer. His major credits include Chicago Fire (2012–2014), Law and Order: Criminal Intent (2001–2010) and Deadline (2000–2001).

Education 
Roman studied Communications and Theater at Oakland University.

Career 
Roman worked as an assistant director on Groundhog Day, Backdraft, Gunsmoke: The Long Ride, Gladiator and The Untouchables.

Filmography 
Television
 Chicago Fire (46 episodes, 2012-2014)
 Eden (Pilot) 2011
 Law & Order: Criminal Intent (180 episodes, 2001 - 2010)
 Conviction (1 episode, 2006)
 Deadline (13 episodes, 2000-2001)
 D.C. (7 episodes, 2000)
 The Untouchables (1993)
 Gabriel's Fire (1990)

Television Movies
 Exiled (1998)
 Every Mother's Worst Fear (1998)
 Daughters (1997)
 The Perfect Daughter (1996)
 The Crying Child (1996)
 The Kid Who Loved Christmas (1990)
 The Haunting of Sarah Hardy (1989)

Film
 Groundhog Day (1993)
 Folks! (1992)
 Straight Talk (1992)
 Gladiator (1992)
 Backdraft (1991)
 Only the Lonely (1991)

Personal life 
Roman currently resides in Los Angeles, California.

References 

Place of birth missing (living people)
American television producers
Year of birth missing (living people)
Living people